Melvin Henry Roberts (January 18, 1943 – September 1, 2007) was an American professional baseball player, coach and manager. Primarily an outfielder during his playing days, all spent in the minor leagues, Roberts spent four seasons (1992–95) in Major League Baseball as the first-base coach of the Philadelphia Phillies, including service on the Phillies' 1993 National League pennant-winning team.

Roberts was born in Abington Township, Montgomery County, Pennsylvania, graduated from Abington Senior High School, and attended both Temple University and Spartanburg Technical College. After spending 1965 out of pro baseball, Roberts signed with the Phillies' system, playing for the 1966 Spartanburg Phillies as a teammate of Larry Bowa and Denny Doyle on a club that won a Western Carolinas League record 25 consecutive games and the league championship. With lengthy service as a player, coach and manager, Roberts became a longtime resident of Spartanburg, South Carolina. In 781 games played, Roberts batted .234 with 588 hits during a ten-season minor league playing career.

After 1970, Roberts' last full-time season as a player, he became a coach in the Philadelphia organization with the Peninsula Phillies (1971), Reading Phillies (1972; 1977), Spartanburg (1973–76; 1978–83; 1985–86), and Bend Phillies (1985). He was the Phillies' roving minor league outfield instructor for one season (1984).

Upon leaving the Phils in 1996 after a 30-year career with the organization, Roberts joined the Atlanta Braves as a minor league coach and spent his final 12 seasons in baseball with the Braves. In 2007, his final campaign, Roberts was a coach with the Rookie-level Danville Braves of the Appalachian League when he died unexpectedly just as the season was concluding, in Danville, Virginia, at age 64, leaving a wife and four children.

References

External links

1943 births
2007 deaths
20th-century African-American sportspeople
21st-century African-American people
African-American baseball coaches
African-American baseball players
Artesia Dodgers players
Bakersfield Bears players
Baseball coaches from Pennsylvania
Baseball players from Pennsylvania
Great Falls Electrics players
Major League Baseball first base coaches
Minor league baseball managers
People from Abington Township, Montgomery County, Pennsylvania
Philadelphia Phillies coaches
Raleigh-Durham Phillies players
Reading Phillies players
St. Petersburg Saints players
Salisbury Dodgers players
Santa Barbara Dodgers players
Spartanburg Phillies players
Sportspeople from Spartanburg, South Carolina
Tidewater Tides players